The Halo video game and media franchise takes place in a fictional science fiction universe. In the distant past, a race known as the Forerunners fought the parasitic Flood. The Forerunners ultimately activate weapons of mass destruction, the Halo Array, in order to starve the Flood and stop the threat. By the 26th century, humanity, led by the United Nations Space Command (UNSC), is caught in a war with an alien coalition known as the Covenant. The Covenant worship the Forerunners as deities, mistakenly believing that the Halos are a tool of salvation, not destruction. The Flood, meanwhile, escape the confines of Halo and threaten to spread across the galaxy again.

A large portion of the series' success lies in the creation of a believable world, and Bungie reinforced the fictional factions the player interacts with via a lengthy design process with the release of each game. The overall design of each faction was slowly developed before the release of the first game in the series, Halo: Combat Evolved, and continually refined in later games' development. Reception of Halos factions has generally been positive. The Covenant were praised by reviewers as exciting and challenging enemies, and later games featuring the Forerunner Prometheans as enemies were criticized as not living up to the same standard. Characters, weapons, and vehicles of all the factions have been released as toys or promotional materials.

Development
Throughout much of Bungie's development of Halo: Combat Evolved, very little concrete story details had been developed for the story campaign, and what enemies the player character would face. Writer Joseph Staten and other Bungie staff came up with the idea of a coalition of alien races, subsequently deciding that the faction would be motivated by religion. Early in the game's development, environmental artist Paul Russel solidified the concept of three "schools" of Halo architecture for the main factions in the game – the humans of the United Nations Space Command (UNSC), the alien alliance of the Covenant, and the Forerunner structures on which most of the game takes place. For future humanity, the artists and developers settled on a functional, industrial look. Art Director Marcus Lehto said that the artists examined current technology trends and tried to extrapolate what future technology would look like. Designs were molded by the desire for building a realized and distinctive feel for the human ships and buildings, but also to make the areas fun to play in. For example, the design team wanted a cramped, claustrophobic feel for the human ship levels in Combat Evolved. Ron Cobb's work on Aliens informed some of the design for a "lived in" appearance. In comparison to the visions of dystopia common in many other science fiction works, the cities and buildings of Earth which were first shown in Halo 2 were clean and functional, with parks and attractive structures. Character design for the UNSC was more straightforward, with uniforms based on existing military outfits, ranks, and insignia. All aspects of the game were designed to feel believable and cultivate suspension of disbelief.

For the Covenant, the team decided on "sleek and shiny", with reflective surfaces, organic shapes, and use of purples. According to art director Marcus Lehto, the principle designs for the faction came from environmental artist Paul Russel, while concept artist Shi Kai Wang was instrumental in developing the look of the various races within the Covenant. Armor color was used to denote ranks of enemies.

Like the character designs, Covenant technology, architecture, and design continually changed throughout development, occasionally for practical reasons as well as aesthetics. According to Eric Arroyo, the Covenant cruiser Truth and Reconciliation, which plays a major role in Halo: Combat Evolved, was to be boarded by the player by a long ramp. However, due to technical considerations of having a fully textured ship so close to the player, the designers came up with a "gravity lift", which allowed the ship to be farther away (thus not requiring as much processing power for detail) as well as adding a "visually interesting" component of Covenant technology.

Weapons and vehicles
Due to Halo being a first-person shooter, significant emphasis was put into the design of the game's weaponry. The chief designer for human weapons was Robert McLees, who at the time of Combat Evolveds development was the only one at Bungie with knowledge of firearms. McLees wanted to make sure that the weapons looked "cool", but were also grounded by real-world physics and considerations. The game designers also wanted items that would be recognizable to players, yet futuristic-looking enough to plausibly exist in Halos 2552. Occasionally, technical restraints forced design changes; the submachine gun introduced in Halo 2 originally featured a transparent magazine which allowed players to see the caseless ammo feed into the gun, but it proved too ambitious given the time and hardware available.

Vehicles play an important role in the Halo games, and so vehicles were also given a long development stage. The UNSC's vehicles were designed to be functional and utilitarian. Their use of wheels also led players to feel that they were more fun to drive. The addition of the Mongoose ATV made headlines, after being cut from Halo 2. The original Warthog was considered a fan favorite.

Paul Russel is considered the architect of the Forerunners' design. In an interview, Russel stated that creating the Forerunners' "visual language" was a tough process which only came together "like five months away" from the game's completion; much of the design was finalized on a single level, "The Silent Cartographer", which features both exterior Forerunner structures as well as deep interior chasms. Concept artist Eddie Smith is also credited with helping hone the Forerunners' direction, and said that he started work by reading the game's mission synopsis. "I knew what human and Covenant architecture looked like, so I tried to make the Forerunner concepts different", Smith said. The result was a sleek angular design which was distinct from the curves of the Covenant's architecture and the functional human designs. For Halo 2, designers wanted to refine and elaborate on the Forerunner design, without abandoning the style set by Russel; environment artist Frank Capezzuto found that looking at the Forerunner structures as sculptures rather than buildings helped to drive the designs for Halo 2.

The art team also spent a large amount of time on Covenant weaponry, in order to make them suitably alien yet still recognizable to players. At the same time, the designers wanted all aspects of Covenant technology, especially the vehicles, to act plausibly. In contrast to human weapons firing projectiles, many of the Covenant's weaponry are depicted as firing plasma. A few of the Covenant's weapons are not plasma-based, including the Needler, which fires razor-sharp pink needles capable of homing at organic foes. A weapons expert noted parallels between the Needler and ancient Greek Amazons painting their daggers pink as a psychological weapon. Bungie designed the majority of Covenant technology to mirror the aesthetic of the Elites; the exteriors are sleek and graceful, with a more angular and complex core underneath hinting at the Forerunner origins of the technology.

Forerunners

The Forerunners were a powerful race that formed a galaxy-wide empire tens of thousands of years before the events of the main game.

According to the official backstory to the series, the Forerunners came to power after they successfully rebelled against their creators, the Precursors. To ensure that the Precursors will never again threaten their existence, the Forerunners exterminated them, except for one imprisoned which they called the Primordial. At the height of their power the Forerunners formed a galaxy-wide empire for more than 100,000 years before the events of the main Halo story arc. The Forerunners successfully usurped the Mantle – protection of all life in the galaxy – from the Precursors.

Much later, they were threatened by the parasitic Flood. The Forerunners took action, but the parasite was unstoppable. A group of Forerunners conceived a plan to stop the Flood once and for all, building an installation known as the Ark that created seven ring-shaped megastructures called "Halos". The Halo Array, when activated, would destroy all sentient life within range – depriving the Flood of its food.

After waiting as long as they could, and traveling the galaxy to collect species from planets, which would later be used to "re-seed" the galaxy, the Forerunners activated the Array and vanished.  Although the parasite's spread across the galaxy was halted, the Forerunners paid a terrible price as they, and all sentient life capable of sustaining the Flood in the galaxy, were annihilated. The Covenant worships the Forerunners as deities and relentlessly searches for Forerunner relics. The reason for the Forerunners' disappearance is revealed in Halo: Combat Evolved when the artificial intelligence Cortana enters one of the Halo's computer networks and learns the true purpose of the Halos. In the Halo: Fractures short story "Promises to Keep", it is revealed that the surviving Forerunners exiled themselves from the galaxy after reseeding life which took about a century.

Additionally, the Forerunners created battle constructs known as "Prometheans", robotic AIs armed with Forerunner weapons to defend areas such as the shield world of Requiem. These machines were defeated in 2559 when Cortana was deleted.

The Forerunners also created highly advanced AIs known as Contender-class AI which were numerous AI "minds" working in synchrony, thus giving it intellectual properties greater than any other AI. The Forerunners also created Sentinels which are machines designed for the defense, construction, and maintenance of Forerunner facilities. Sentinels are also used in Flood outbreaks since their "beam" is useful as it not only destroys dead combat forms, it disintegrates them to prevent reanimation.

Another invention of the Forerunners depicted in the games and novels is artificial planets known as shield worlds. First appearing in Halo: Ghosts of Onyx, shield worlds are constructs designed to act as bomb shelters from the Halo Array. Generally, they are made up of an outer terrestrial planet with the shield world contained inside in the form of a micro-Dyson sphere.

Halo Array
The Halo Array is a group of fictional megastructures and superweapons in the Halo science-fiction franchise, consisting of ringworlds known as Halos built by a structure known as Ark. They are referred to as "Installations" by their artificial intelligence caretakers and were created by an ancient race known as the Forerunners. The series' alien antagonists, the Covenant, refer to the Halos as the "Sacred Rings", believing them to form part of a greater religious prophecy known as "The Great Journey". In the games' stories, the Forerunners built the Halo Array to contain and study the Flood, an infectious alien parasite. The rings act together as a weapon of last resort; when fired, they kill all sentient life in the galaxy capable of falling prey to the Flood, thereby starving the parasite of its food. The battle to prevent their activation forms the crux of the plot progression for the first Halo trilogy of games.

The Halos are closer in proportion to the Orbitals of Iain M. Banks in shape and design, or to a Bishop Ring, an actually proposed space habitat first explained by Forrest Bishop. As seen in the games, Halo installations feature a metallic exterior but an inner surface filled with an atmosphere, water, plant life, and animal life. What appears to be docking ports and windows dot the exterior surface, suggesting that a fraction of the ring structure itself is hollow and used for maintenance, living, and power generation.

Before the title of the game that would become Halo: Combat Evolved was announced, while development was in its early stages, the megastructure on which the game took place was a massive, hollowed-out planet called "Solipsis". As ideas evolved, the planet became a Dyson Sphere, and then a Dyson Ring. Some Bungie staffers felt the change to a ringworld was "ripping off Larry Niven", according to Bungie artist Paul Russel. Bungie employee Frank O'Connor wrote in a post on Bungie that "the specific accusation that we swiped the idea of a ring-shaped planet wholesale is not accurate", explaining that Bungie used a ringworld because "it's cool and therefore the type of thing a Forerunner civilization would build." The immense scale of the Dyson megastructures was shrunk for the Halos, as artist Mark Goldsworthy noted that they wanted players to be able to see the ring stretching into the sky and behold the scale of the ringworlds.

Physicist Kevin Grazier calculated that a Halo constructed using conventional steel alloys and composed of 50% empty space would result in a total mass of 1.7x1017 kg. The amount of material required to build such a ring would be akin to the total material available in the asteroid belt.

Flood

The Flood (originally called the shaping sickness) is a parasite which is driven by a desire to infect, kill, or consume all sentient life it encounters. The Flood first appears in Halo: Combat Evolved, when the Covenant release some captured specimens from stasis on Installation 04; the parasite spreads and threatens to escape the ring, until the Master Chief destabilizes the installation with a massive explosion coming from the Pillar of Autumn. It is also later found in Halo 2 on Installation 05 along with the Gravemind, an enormous tentacled creature that acts as the parasite's central intelligence. In Halo 3, the Flood reaches the Halo Ark using the giant Covenant holy city High Charity. Master Chief then defeats the Flood once again by firing the incomplete replacement for Installation 04, which damages but does not destroy the Ark. The Gravemind, present on the replacement ring when it explodes from the strain, accepts defeat, but insists that it will only slow, not stop, the Flood.

In the Halo Wars 2 expansion pack Awakening the Nightmare, some of the Flood is revealed to have survived the firing of Installation 08 in the ruins of the Covenant holy city High Charity. Recognizing the danger, the Ark's defenses erected a containment shield around the ruins to successfully quarantine the surviving Flood inside the city. However, Banished forces, believing the Flood to just be another of the Covenant's lies, deactivate the Ark's defense systems and breach the containment shield, releasing the Flood upon the Ark once again. The Flood forms a Proto-Gravemind which grows quickly and becomes dangerously close to becoming a new Gravemind. However, the Banished reactivate the Ark's defenses and kill the Proto-Gravemind. With the Proto-Gravemind dead, the Banished and the Ark's Sentinels are able to contain the new Flood outbreak and seal off High Charity once again.

The Flood were added early in the game development stage of Halo: Combat Evolved, and life of Halo was specifically tailored to increasing the surprise of the Flood's sudden appearance, halfway through the first game. At one point, Halo featured large numbers of terrestrial dinosaur-like creatures, but Bungie felt the presence of other native species would dilute the impact of the Flood and removed them.

United Nations Space Command
The United Nations Space Command (UNSC) is the main faction of future humanity and is the main protagonist of the original Halo trilogy. The UNSC was formed in the mid-2160s under the United Nations and would later become the military arm of the Unified Earth Government (UEG). According to Halo story architects Frank O'Conner and Robert McLees, during the 26th-century events of Halo, the UNSC exercises considerably more power than its civilian counterpart.

Before the beginning of the war with the Covenant, humanity was in turmoil, with the remote colonies fighting for independence from the UEG. These rebels were multiple factions known as the Insurrectionists, that engaged the UNSC in a galactic civil war known as the "Insurrection", that began in 2492. To help quell the revolts, the UNSC commissioned the highly classified SPARTAN Project, responsible for the development of four generations of unique, highly trained infantry, collectively called Spartans, who operate in powered armor known as MJOLNIR. The Spartans undertook classified missions against rebels and insurrectionists. When the Covenant began destroying the outer colonies, these Spartans became humanity's best hope against the technological superiority of the Covenant.

One of the UNSC's unclassified special forces units are the Orbital Drop Shock Troopers or ODSTs. They are also called 'Helljumpers' after their motto "Feet first into hell." They specialize in orbital combat insertions via Single-Occupant Exoatmospheric Insertion Vehicles (SOEIVs) jettisoned from ships in low orbit. As characterized by author William C. Dietz in Halo: The Flood, the future corps shares thematic similarities to the present-day United States Army.

The most important Special Force unit in the game is the SPARTAN project, more importantly, the second generation of Spartans within the project – a group of specially trained supersoldiers. John-117, the main playable character in the main trilogy, is one of the few known surviving Spartan-IIs. The UNSC has an army, which serves as a ground defensive force within the UNSC military.

The UNSC also fields various ground vehicles for combat; among these is a general-purpose scout 'jeep' dubbed the "Warthog" or simply the "'Hog", a working replica of which was created by special effects company Weta Workshop for a series of shorts by director Neill Blomkamp. This vehicle had fully functioning four-wheel steering, machine-gun, digital displays, and air-bags.

Following humanity's first contact with the Covenant in 2525, at the Battle of Harvest, the UNSC had declared another galactic conflict known as the "Human-Covenant War". From 2525 to 2552, the Covenant was extremely successful in committing genocide of the human species across the cosmos. All the while the Insurrectionists resumed their feud with the UNSC. By 2537 the rebels had all but been defeated but when the Covenant and the Flood were defeated with the help of the Covenant separatist in 2552, the Insurrection reignited and the Covenant remnants also resumed their hostilities against the humans while others had allied with them until at least 2560.    

The initialization "UNSC" has occasionally been confused with the United Nations Security Council. For example, on May 24, 2012, a BBC news report on the UN used the Halo UNSC logo, as opposed to the United Nations Security Council logo, as a background image.

Covenant

The Covenant is a theocratic collection of alien races, existing as a massive empire for thousands of years. In many Halo video games, they fill an antagonistic role. The alliance worships an ancient alien race known as the Forerunners and searches for their deities' relics. The novel Halo: Contact Harvest reveals that the Covenant's luminaries, devices that search for Forerunner relics, discovered a massive cache of the relics on a human colony, Harvest. The Forerunner artificial intelligence Mendicant Bias awakens and reveals to three Covenant politicians that the "relics" are in fact the humans themselves – Bias identifies them as descendants of his makers. Worried that the discovery of such a secret would destroy the Covenant, the High Prophet leadership instead directs the Covenant to destroy humanity and its United Nations Space Command (UNSC) as an affront to the deities. This leads to the search for Halo, an ancient weapon designed by the Forerunners to attempt to contain the Flood which was destroyed by the UNSC in Halo: Combat Evolved. In Halo 2, the Covenant splits apart in a civil war, known as the "Great Schism", primarily between the Elite separatist and the Brute loyalist. This is when the Elites learn of their leaders' treachery; the Elites eventually ally with humanity to stop the rest of the Covenant from activating the Halos in an attempt to follow the Forerunners into liberation. In Halo 3, the Covenant along with the Flood are completely destroyed during the battle on the Ark by the joint forces of the Elites and the UNSC.

Prior to the events of Halo 4, some of the Elites who had left the Covenant and fought against it, in a conflict known as the "Blooding Years" form a new faction led by Jul 'Mdama. This smaller faction self-proclaims war to be a new "Covenant", existing as an entirely different organization. In 2557, Jul 'Mdama's faction serve as an antagonist against the UNSC in Halo 4, who ally with the Prometheans in their wake and subsequently they serve as an antagonist in Halo 5: Guardians but they are defeated in 2558. The latter summon the "Created", who were titan machines of the Forerunners, who were being led by Cortana. This Covenant remnant had ceased their allegiance with them and the "Created" faction in 2558 had been defeated in 2559 when Cortana was deleted. While the "Blooding Years", continued until at least 2560, due to the Elite separatists waging war with at least one other Elite faction, the "Great Schism" with the Brutes continued until at least that same year, and the Brutes like their Elite counterparts were also engaged in multiple civil wars of their own, again at least until the dawn of that decade.

Covenant society is depicted as a caste system composed of different species. Bungie's artists looked at live animals and films for inspiration; as a result, the species within the Covenant bear simian, reptilian, avian, and ursine characteristics. Concept artist Shi Kai Wang focused on making each enemy seem appropriate to its role in gameplay. The species within the Covenant include:
 Elites (called Sangheili in the Covenant language) who stand nearly 8'6 (2.6 m) and feature recharging personal shields. The Elites initially had simple mouths, which developed into pairs of split mandibles substituting for the lower jaws. Bungie concept artist Shi Kai Wang noted that project leads Jason Jones had been insistent on giving the Elites a tail. While Wang thought it made the aliens look too animalistic, the idea was dropped due to practical considerations, including where the tail would go when the Elites were driving vehicles. According to Paul Russel, when Bungie was bought by Microsoft and Halo was turned into an Xbox launch title, Microsoft took issue with the design of the Elites, as they felt that the Elites had a resemblance to cats that might alienate Japanese consumers.
 Grunts or Unggoy, are commonly depicted as basic foot soldiers and are used as a cannon fodder-like unit. Squat and cowardly fighters, Grunts panic and run if players kill their leaders.
 Jackals or Kig-Yar carry energy shields or ranged weaponry. In some cases, such as with the Jackals, the overall design was honed once the enemy's role was clearly defined.
 Hunters or Lekgolo are collectives of alien worms encased in tough armor. Initial concepts were less humanoid-looking and softer than the final shape, with angular shields and razor-sharp spines.
 Prophets or San 'Shyuum serves as the supreme rulers of the Covenant and were primarily designed by Shi Kai Wang and Eric Arroyo. Originally, the Prophets were built in a more unified way, with the gravity thrones they used for flotation and movement fused with the Prophet's organic structures. The characters were also designed to be feeble, yet sinister. The three Prophet Hierarchs were each individually designed.
 Brutes or Jiralhanae are even more physically imposing than the Elites, with their society organized around tribal chieftains. Inspired by the animators watching biker films, the Brutes incorporated simian and ursine elements while retaining an alien look. Wang's final concept for the creatures in Halo 2, replete with bandoliers and human skulls, was simplified for the game. Brutes were meant to typify the abusive alien menace of the Covenant and in the words of design lead Jaime Griesemer, to serve as "barbarians in Rome".

Other members of the Covenant include insectoid Drones (Yanme'e); the animators found the creatures challenging, as they had to be animated to walk, run, crawl, or fly on multiple surfaces. Old concept art from Combat Evolved was repurposed in influencing the Drone's final shape, which took cues from cockroaches, grasshoppers, and wasps. Cut from Combat Evolved were floating support workers known as Engineers (Huragok), actually constructed machines rather than organic creatures. They later made appearances in Halo Wars and Halo 3: ODST, as well as various novels.

With subsequent games, the Covenant and its look were changed or refined to account for increased graphic hardware or gameplay needs. In Halo 3, the Brutes became the primary enemy, and they were heavily redesigned. Concept artists took inspiration from rhinoceroses and gorillas, and armored them with buckles and clothing to represent a different aesthetic look compared to the Covenant. Weaponry was designed to reflect the Brute's "souls" distilled to their purest form – conveyed by dangerous shapes, harsh colors, and objects that looked "dangerous to be around". The more seasoned the Brute, the more ornate clothing, and helmets; the armor was designed to convey culture and tradition to the species, and emphasize their mass and power. Designs for Halo 3 took cues from ancient Greek Spartans. Character animators recorded intended actions for the new Brutes in a padded room at Bungie. A new addition to the Brute artificial intelligence was a pack mentality; leader Brutes directed large-scale actions simultaneously, such as throwing grenades toward a player.

Halo: Reach served as a prequel to Halo: Combat Evolved, and creative director Marcus Lehto pushed for the team to revamp the Covenant. The aliens' translated English was replaced with untranslated, guttural alien sounds, and their look and weaponry were redesigned. The goal was to make the Covenant intimidating and more alien to players. Halo: Reach also featured a Jackel variant called a skirmisher that had two small shields on each of its arms and dodged things easily. These new enemies later were included in Halo: Infinite.

The Covenant serves as one of a number of religious allusions in Halo. Their name refers to sacred agreements between the people of Israel and their God in Jewish and Christian tradition and could be used to indicate the attitude of superiority complex the aliens have toward the inferior and sacrilegious humans. The Covenant's ships bear names referring to elements of the Judeo-Christian religion. A review of religions and religious material in video games noted that the Covenant's invented religion had many similarities to those in similar games, and would likely be called a cult in the real world. The thematic parallels of religious zealots fighting an American military metaphor was not lost on Microsoft's content review team, who forced a name change of the holy warrior "Dervish" to Arbiter before the release of Halo 2. Theologian P.C.J.M. Paulissen notes that while on the surface the Halo games present a conflict between rational humans and religious alien fanaticism, the comparison is complicated by the technical superiority of the Covenant (they wield energy weapons compared to primitive human ballistics) and the games seem to reject the idea science and religion are rigidly disconnected.

Insurrectionists
The Insurrectionists, nicknamed Innies by the UNSC Marines and also known as Insurgents or simply Rebels, were groups of individuals rebelling against the Unified Earth Government. They were at odds with a variety of their agencies during the Insurrection, an undeclared civil war between the UNSC and numerous Insurrectionist factions. Before the beginning of the war with the Covenant, humanity was in turmoil, with the remote colonies fighting for independence from the UEG.

These rebels were multiple factions known as the Insurrectionists, that engaged the UNSC in a galactic civil war known as the "Insurrection", that began in 2492. From 2525 to 2552, the Covenant was extremely successful in committing genocide of the human species across the cosmos. All the while the Insurrectionists resumed their feud with the UNSC. By 2537 the rebels had all but been defeated but when the Covenant and the Flood were defeated with the help of the Covenant separatist in 2552, the Insurrection reignited and the Covenant remnants also resumed their hostilities against the humans while others had allied with them, at least until 2560.

Banished
A mercenary organization that splintered off from the Covenant, the Banished, is led by the Brute known as Atriox. They rose to power after Atriox led other disgruntled members of the Jiralhanae species to rebel against their Sangheili masters. The newly  formed “Banished” started off as pirates, conducting surgical strikes against the Covenant and scavenging for resources and supplies. Composed of various alien mercenaries, Atriox welcomes competent members from all species into the Banished, including humans who have joined. They first appear in Halo Wars 2, after they invade the Forerunner installation known as the Ark, later coming in conflict with the crew of the presumed-lost UNSC ship Spirit of Fire. The Banished subsequently appear in the novels Halo Shadows of Reach and Halo Divine Wind. The Banished  return in Halo Infinite as an antagonist hostile to humanity's UNSC, under the command of the Brute War Chief Escharum. Throughout the course of the game, the Master Chief battles the Banished across the surface of Halo Installation 07. The Banished seek to control Zeta Halo and ally themselves with the Harbinger who wishes to release her race, the Endless. The Master Chief succeeds in stopping the repair of the ring, killing Escharum and a number of other high-ranking Banished members as well as the Harbinger. However, it is revealed that Atriox, presumed dead early in the conflict, has survived and he locates the Endless.

Cultural impact

Merchandise
Halo has a variety of affiliated merchandise. A version of the strategy board game Risk was released based on Halo Wars with game pieces being modeled after the UNSC, Covenant, and Flood. A mix of human and Covenant vehicles and weapons were also featured in the Halo ActionClix tabletop game and a series by McFarlane Toys. Game journalists have even noted the similarities between the Warthog and the Hummer HX, which GM denies. The merchandise includes several series of action figures. The first series of figures were created by Joyride Studios, and featured characters, weapons, and vehicles representing all of Halos factions. The task of creating Halo 3s action figures fell to McFarlane Toys; in an interview with Bungie, Todd McFarlane stated that the challenge of creating figures for a franchise was that designers had to accommodate and integrate both articulation and attention to detail, "without compromising one or the other too heavily". A total of three series of figurines have since been produced, featuring UNSC, Flood, and Covenant forces. Manufacturer Kotobukiya also produced "high-end statues" for Halo 3s debut. Other merchandise based on the weapons of the Halo universe include die cast weapons replicas and a set of Covenant weapons used for Laser tag.

Critical reception
Halos universe and the factions in it have been well-received, both from a storytelling point of view and from game play. Gamasutra lauded Halos artificial intelligence. For example, Covenant or Flood forces never spawn in the same places when the player restarts from checkpoints, which gives the player "the sense that the [alien] creatures have things to do besides killing humans". Bungie's goal of making characters behave realistically in the games has led to the behavior of the Covenant, Flood, and Forerunner units being praised in each game of the series. A point of criticism has been the AI of allied UNSC characters; reviewers noted that in Halo 3, they were often more of a hindrance than help.

The various factions that make up the Halo universe were each received differently. The Flood have been alternatively praised as terrifying foes, and lambasted as annoying zombie-like enemies; the literary adaptations of the Flood, particularly their representation in The Halo Graphic Novel, have been best received.

Notes

Fictional organizations
Halo (franchise)
Video game species and races